The E84 BMW X1 is a subcompact luxury crossover SUV and was produced from 2009 to 2015. It is the first generation model of the BMW X1 range, and was replaced by the F48 BMW X1 in mid-2015.

Development and launch 

Development of the vehicle started in 2006 as petrol prices were going up, BMW identified the need for a smaller and more efficient model in its SUV line-up. As the result, it was reported that BMW has shortened the development and pre-production time by 40 percent compared to previous X Series models.

The project director of the X1, Peter Kist commented that "never before has BMW produced a model that is meant for such a wide customer range." He pointed out it is suitable for young people and older people, and as X1 is the first BMW X Series to be available in the sDrive trim (two-wheel drive), it is suitable for customers who do not need off-road capability.

The E84 X1 was revealed in a near-production prototype called the Concept X1 that was revealed at the Paris Motor Show in October 2008.

The final production version of the X1 is based on the same platform used in the E90 3 Series, and both have the same  wheelbase. The platform is also used in the Zinoro 1E, which is an all-electric crossover based on the X1, with a rear-mounted  electric motor that produces  of torque.

The X1 is available in rear-wheel drive (marketed as sDrive), and all-wheel drive (xDrive) variants with a 40/60 rear-bias.

Equipment 
The X1 offers  of cargo volume. Standard equipment includes dual-zone climate control, parking sensors, 17-inch alloy wheels, and regenerative braking. From 2012, the X1 is also offered in xLine, Sport, and M Sport trims.

xDrive25i and 35i models are only available with a 6-speed automatic transmission. The rest of the model range receives a 6-speed manual transmission and all models (except the sDrive20d EfficientDynamics) are optionally available with an automatic transmission. 18i and 23d models receive a 6-speed automatic, while 20i, 16d, and 25d models are available with an 8-speed automatic.

28i, 18d, and 20d models featured a 6-speed automatic until 2011, before being replaced by an 8-speed transmission.

Models

Petrol engines

Diesel engines

Special models

Powder Ride Edition 
The X1 Powder Ride edition was released in November 2012 as an option for xDrive28i and 35i models. It is based on the Concept K2 Powder Ride unveiled earlier at the 2012 Los Angeles International Auto Show and was done in collaboration with K2 Sports. Models feature xLine specific equipment (including exclusive paint colours, restyled exterior elements, 18-inch alloy wheels, and a multifunction sports leather steering wheel), as well as a roof rack and roof box, and Powder Ride Edition decals on the doors and wheel arches. In winter 2013, an X1 Edition Powder Ride was introduced for xDrive20i, 28i, 18d, 20d, and 25d models with similar features.

Emergency vehicles 
A version of the X1 sDrive16d specifically made for use in the emergency services was unveiled at RETTmobil 2013, an annual convention held to showcase rescue and emergency vehicles. The car, named BMW X1 First Responder, features custom livery, a head-up display, speed-limit information, night-vision, and a navigation system with real-time traffic information. An X1 xDrive20d fire command vehicle was also showcased a year later at RETTmobil 2014.

Model year changes

2011 
The following changes took effect from autumn 2011:

 X1 sDrive20d EfficientDynamics model introduced
 xDrive28i engine updated to N20B20 (2.0-litre 4-cylinder turbo) and now features a manual transmission
 Diesel models receive increased noise insulation
 20i, 28i, and 20d models now feature brake stand-by function and hill-start assistant features

2012 facelift 

The following changes were shown at the 2012 New York International Auto Show:

 Exterior design changes including: redesigned headlights, taillights, front bumpers, and redesigned mirrors with integrated indicators
 Interior changes including: an updated centre console design, new interior trim choices, and a new steering wheel design
 Introduction of xLine, Sport, and M Sport trims
 Addition of BMW EfficientDynamics program on all models (including features such as electric power steering and an engine start-stop system)
 Introduction of the first X1 models for the United States market

2014 
The updated X1 was unveiled at the 2014 North American International Auto Show and went on sale in spring of 2014:

 Updated BMW ConnectedDrive services
 Addition of new interior trim options, new Sparkling Brown metallic exterior paint colour, and new 17-inch alloy wheel design

Safety 
The 2012 X1 scored five stars overall in the Euro NCAP test.

Production volumes 
The following are production figures for the E84 X1:

Awards 
 2009 Auto Zeitung “Auto Trophy”
 2010 Auto Zeitung "Design Trophy"
 2010 Red Dot award for outstanding product design
 2010 Auto Bild Design Award in the “SUV, Van and All-Wheel-Drive” category

References 

X1
Compact sport utility vehicles
Luxury crossover sport utility vehicles
All-wheel-drive vehicles
Rear-wheel-drive vehicles
Luxury sport utility vehicles
Euro NCAP small off-road
Cars introduced in 2009
2010s cars